Horace Ray Clover (20 March 1895 –  1 January 1984) was a leading Australian rules footballer in the (then) Victorian Football League (VFL).

Family
The son of Robert James Clover (1864-1900), and Phoebe Rubina Clover (-1901), née Smith, Horace Ray Clover was born at Carisbrook, Victoria on 20 March 1895.

He married Alberta Victoria Porter (1901-1983) on 29 January 1927.

Football
At 6 ft. 1in., he had a long reach: his finger-tip to finger-tip span was 6 ft. 5in.

Carlton (VFL)
"There's quite a story behind Horrie Clover's entry into Carlton, showing that his connection with football was something of a freak. The bare outline of this story will be sufficient. Actually he came to Melbourne in 1919 and joined the Carlton Cricket Club, with no thought of football.While on a cricket tour with the V.C.A. team to Mildura and Wentworth in association with the late Lyle Downs, a dyed-in-the-wool Carltonite. He and Lyle joined a group of locals having some practice kicks at Wentworth. Evidentlv Lyle saw enough because, as Horrie himself said, "After that he never let up on me until I put of a [Carlton] uniform". — Rod McGregor, The Sporting Globe.

Clover was a high-marking centre half-forward who starred from his first game, kicking three goals and hitting the post four times.

Victoria (VFL)
He was selected to play for Victoria against South Australia on the MCG on 29 May 1920, after having only played three senior VFL games; however, due to an injury he sustained in the match against Essendon on 22 May 1920, he was unable to play, and was replace in the selected side by Paddy O'Brien.

Carlton official
Clover was Carlton's key player during his career, including stints as playing coach in 1922-23 and 1927 for 26 wins from 45 matches.  He also served as club secretary, vice-president and president over many years.

Hall of fame
Called "one of the finest exponents of the centre-half-forward position that the game has known", Clover was inducted into the Australian Football Hall of Fame in 1996.

References

Sources

 Discovering Anzacs: Profile: Horace Ray Clover (4455), at National Archives of Australia.
 First World War Embarkation Roll: Private Horace Ray Clover (4456), collection of the Australian War Memorial.
 First World War Nominal Roll: Private Horace Roy Clover (4455), collection of the Australian War Memorial.
 World War One Service Record: Private Horace Ray Clover (4455), at National Archives of Australia.
 Footballer Who Gambles With Death: Runs Grave Risk With Every Kick, The (Sydney) Daily Pictorial, (Tuesday, 12 August 1930), p.5.
 Atkinson, G. (1982) Everything you ever wanted to know about Australian rules football but couldn't be bothered asking, The Five Mile Press: Melbourne. .
 Clover, H.R., "The Art of Forward Play: By Carlton's Own Clover", The Sporting Globe, (Wednesday, 30 August 1922), p.7.
 Clover, H.R., "Football Needs Cleansing: Horrie Clover's Timely Criticism", The Sporting Globe, (Saturday, 20 September 1924), p.7.
 J.W., "Notes and Comments", The Australasian, (Saturday, 22 May 1926), p.38: remarks on Clover's presence in the VFL's Umpire and Permit Committee.
 Ross, J. (ed), 100 Years of Australian Football 1897–1996: The Complete Story of the AFL, All the Big Stories, All the Great Pictures, All the Champions, Every AFL Season Reported, Viking, (Ringwood), 1996. 
 
 Sharland, W.S., "Idol of Carlton Crowds: Australia's Best Centre Half-Forward", The Sporting Globe, (Saturday, 4 August 1928), p.6.

External links

 "Horrie Clover, the famous Carlton centre half-forward, was caught by the camera making his place kick of 70 yards 1 foot 8 inches at the Melbourne Motordrome last week", The Sporting Globe, (Wednesday, 8 August 1928), p.1.
 
 
 Horrie Clover, at Boyles Football Photos.
 Horrie Clover, at Blueseum.
 Australian Football Hall of Fame

1895 births
1984 deaths
Australian rules footballers from Victoria (Australia)
Australian Rules footballers: place kick exponents
Carlton Football Club players
Carlton Football Club coaches
Australian Football Hall of Fame inductees
VFL Leading Goalkicker Medal winners
Maryborough Football Club players
Australian military personnel of World War I
People from Maryborough, Victoria
Military personnel from Victoria (Australia)